Calycularia is the only genus of liverwort in the family Calyculariaceae.  It was formerly included within the Allisoniaceae, and it includes only two species.

References

External links

Fossombroniales
Liverwort genera